Carbon Canyon may refer to:

Carbon Canyon Regional Park, a county park in Brea, California.
California State Route 142 (Carbon Canyon Road), a state highway that travels between Orange County and San Bernardino County in California.
Carbon Canyon Dam, a dam at the northeastern edge of Orange County, California.

Brea, California
Chino Hills, California